Dag Holmen-Jensen (born 16 May 1954) is a Norwegian former ski jumper.

Career
His best career result is World Cup victory in 1981 on Bloudkova velikanka in Planica. He never performed at any Winter Olympic Games or FIS Nordic World Ski Championships.

World Cup

Standings

Wins

References

Norwegian male ski jumpers
1954 births
Living people